Ēriks Rauska (27 May 1899 – 14 January 1981) was a Latvian weightlifter. He competed in the men's lightweight event at the 1924 Summer Olympics.

References

External links
 

1899 births
1981 deaths
Latvian male weightlifters
Olympic weightlifters of Latvia
Weightlifters at the 1924 Summer Olympics
People from Valka
20th-century Latvian people